Takli Island is an island off the southern coast of the Alaska Peninsula in the Shelikof Strait of southwestern Alaska.  It is located at the mouth of Amalik Bay, off the mainland portion of Kodiak Island Borough, in Katmai National Park and Preserve.  The area was first archaeologically investigated in the 1960s, when the prehistory of the area was little known, and the island's sites are type sites for a series of archaeological cultures.

The island was listed on the National Register of Historic Places in 1978  and was added as a contributing site to the Amalik Bay Archeological District, a National Historic Landmark District, in 2005.

See also
List of islands of Alaska
National Register of Historic Places listings in Kodiak Island Borough, Alaska
National Register of Historic Places listings in Katmai National Park and Preserve

References

Islands of Alaska
Islands of Kodiak Island Borough, Alaska
Archaeological sites on the National Register of Historic Places in Alaska
Historic districts on the National Register of Historic Places in Alaska
National Register of Historic Places in Kodiak Island Borough, Alaska
National Register of Historic Places in Katmai National Park and Preserve